The eighth European Parliament was elected in the 2014 elections and lasted until the 2019 elections.

Major events

 22–25 May 2014
 Elections to the Eighth Parliament.
 1 July 2014
 First meeting (constitutive session) of the Eighth Parliament.
 Martin Schulz is elected as President of the European Parliament.
 Vice-presidents elections.
 17 January 2017
 Antonio Tajani is elected as President of the European Parliament.
 18 January 2017
 Vice-presidents elections.

Activity

Major resolutions and positions

Committees

Summary

Temporary committees

Committees of enquiry

Delegations

Political groups

Members in groups by country

Leadership

Presidents

Vice-Presidents

Quaestors

Membership

After the 2014 election, the members formed seven groups with 52 independent members, mainly MEPs against the Union who failed to unify into a political group.

Apportionment

Secretariat

See also

Elections

Membership lists

Notes

References

External links
European Parliament

 8